WISEPA J174124.26+255319.5 (designation is abbreviated to WISE 1741+2553) is a brown dwarf of spectral class T9, located in constellation Hercules at approximately 15.2 light-years from Earth.

History of observations

Discovery
WISE 1741+2553 was discovered in 2011 from data, collected by Wide-field Infrared Survey Explorer (WISE) Earth-orbiting satellite — NASA infrared-wavelength 40 cm (16 in) space telescope, which mission lasted from December 2009 to February 2011. WISE 1741+2553 has three discovery papers: Scholz et al. (2011), Gelino et al. (2011) and Kirkpatrick et al. (2011).

Scholz et al. discovered two late T-type brown dwarfs, including WISE 1741+2553, using preliminary data release from WISE and follow-up near-infrared spectroscopy with  near-infrared camera/spectrograph at the Large Binocular Telescope (LBT).
Gelino et al. examined for binarity nine brown dwarfs using Laser Guide Star Adaptive Optics system (LGS-AO) on Keck II telescope on Mauna Kea; seven of these nine brown dwarfs were also newfound, including WISE 1741+2553. These observations had indicated that two of these nine brown dwarfs are binary, but the other seven, including WISE 1741+2553, are single brown dwarfs.
Kirkpatrick et al. presented discovery of 98 new found by WISE brown dwarf systems with components of spectral types M, L, T and Y, among which also was WISE 1741+2553.

Distance

Space motion
WISE 1741+2553 has proper motion of about 1553 milliarcseconds per year.

See also
Another object, discovered by Scholz et al. (2011):
WISE 0254+0223 (T8)

The other eight objects, checked for binarity by Gelino et al. (2011) on Keck II:
binarity found:
WISE 0458+6434 (T8.5 + T9.5, component A discovered before by Mainzer et al. (2011))
WISE 1841+7000 (T5 + T5, newfound)
binarity not found:
WISE 0750+2725 (T8.5, newfound)
WISE 1322-2340 (T8, newfound)
WISE 1614+1739 (T9, newfound)
WISE 1617+1807 (T8, discovered before by Burgasser et al. (2011))
WISE 1627+3255 (T6, newfound)
WISE 1653+4444 (T8, newfound)
List of nearest stars
WISE 1541-2250 — Y0.5 object (44 light-years)
UGPS 0722−05 — similar T9 object (13 light-years)

Notes

References

External links
Two new nearby brown dwarfs found  (Phil Plait August 9, 2011)
Solstation.com (New Objects within 20 light-years)

Brown dwarfs
T-type stars
Hercules (constellation)
20110901
WISE objects